Dangerous Toys is the debut album by Texas hard rock band Dangerous Toys, released in 1989. It includes the singles "Teas'n Pleas'n" and "Scared," the former covered by Shadows Fall on Fallout from the War, the latter a tribute to Alice Cooper. "Sportin' a Woody" was also released as a single to promote the album.

Although second guitarist Danny Aaron is pictured on the album's back cover and credited for playing, he does not play on the album. Tim Trembley left Dangerous Toys before the recording sessions began, leaving Scott Dalhover their only guitarist, who played all guitar parts on the album.

Dangerous Toys remains the band's best-selling album, having been certified gold by the RIAA in 1994, and receiving their highest chart position in the United States at number 65.

Track listing

Personnel

Dangerous Toys
 Jason McMaster - vocals
 Scott Dalhover - guitar
 Mike Watson - bass, backing vocals
 Mark Geary - drums
 Danny Aaron - guitar, backing vocals (credited, but did not play)

Additional musicians
Paula Salvatore - backing vocals on "Feels Like a Hammer"
and Simms Ellison

Production
Max Norman - producer, engineer, mixing at Record Plant, Los Angeles
Aaron Isaacs, Bruce Barris - assistant engineers
Bob Ludwig - mastering at Masterdisk, New York

Charts

Certifications

References

1989 debut albums
Albums produced by Max Norman
Dangerous Toys albums
Columbia Records albums
Albums recorded at Sound City Studios